Volodymyr Stelmakh (born January 18, 1939, Oleksiivka, Sumy Oblast) — banker, economist (Candidate of Science (PhD) in Economics), politician and Governor of the National Bank of Ukraine from January 21, 2000 – December 17, 2002 and December 16, 2004 – December 23, 2010.

In February 2010 he was awarded the Order of Yaroslav the Wise (second degree).

Governor of the National Bank of Ukraine
From January 2000 to January 2003 Stelmakh served his first turn as Governor of the National Bank of Ukraine (NBU) According to Stelmakh, one of the main initiators of his resignation was the then Prime Minister of Ukraine Anatoliy Kinakh who wanted to cover the lack of revenue to the State budget-2002 by printing more money. As head of the NBU he stated he was categorically against such a step, because it was fraught with a jump in inflation.

On December 16, 2004 Stelmakh was again appointed the Governor of the NBU

During the 2007 Ukrainian parliamentary election Stelmakh was placed number 28 on the electionlist of Our Ukraine–People's Self-Defense Bloc. However, Stelmakh refused the deputy mandate in favor of his post at the NBU.

References

|-

1939 births
Living people
People from Sumy Oblast
Ukrainian politicians
Recipients of the title of Hero of Ukraine
Recipients of the Order of Prince Yaroslav the Wise, 2nd class
Recipients of the Order of Prince Yaroslav the Wise, 3rd class
Recipients of the Order of Prince Yaroslav the Wise, 4th class
Recipients of the Order of Prince Yaroslav the Wise, 5th class
Governors of the National Bank of Ukraine
Financial University under the Government of the Russian Federation alumni
Laureates of the State Prize of Ukraine in the Field of Architecture
Laureates of the Honorary Diploma of the Verkhovna Rada of Ukraine
Soviet bankers